Submission is a 2004 English-language Dutch short drama film produced and directed by Theo van Gogh, and written by Ayaan Hirsi Ali (a former member of the Dutch House of Representatives for the People's Party for Freedom and Democracy); it was shown on NPO 3, a Dutch public broadcasting network, on 29 August 2004. The film's title is one of the possible translations of the Arabic word "Islam". A Muslim extremist reacted to the film by assassinating Van Gogh.

Content

The film tells the story of four fictional characters played by a single actress wearing a veil, but clad in a see-through Hijab, her naked body painted with verses from the Quran. The characters are Muslim women who have been abused in various ways. The film contains monologues of these women and dramatically highlights three verses of the Koran (and ), by showing them painted on women’s bodies.

Motivation
Writer Hirsi Ali has said "it is written in the Koran a woman may be slapped if she is disobedient. This is one of the evils I wish to point out in the film". In an answer to a question about whether the film would offend Muslims, Hirsi Ali said that "if you're a Muslim woman and you read the Koran, and you read in there that you should be raped if you say 'no' to your husband, that is offensive. And that is insulting."

Director Theo Van Gogh, who was known as a controversial and provocative personality, called the film a "political pamphlet."

Reception
The film drew praise for portraying the ways in which women are abused in accordance with fundamentalist Islamic law, as well as anger for criticising Islamic canon itself. It drew the following comment from movie critic Phill Hall, "Submission was bold in openly questioning misogyny and a culture of violence against women because of Koranic interpretations. The questions raised in the film deserve to be asked: is it divine will to assault or kill women? Is there holiness in holding women at substandard levels, denying them the right to free will and independent thought? And ultimately, how can such a mindframe exist in the 21st century?" Film critic Dennis Lim, on the other hand, stated that, "It's depressing to think that this morsel of glib effrontery could pass as a serious critique of conservative Islam." Another (unnamed) critic referred to the stories told in the film as "simplistic, even caricatures".

After the film's broadcast on Dutch television, newspaper De Volkskrant reported claims of plagiarism against Hirsi Ali and Van Gogh, made by Internet journalist Francisco van Jole. Van Jole said the duo had "aped" the ideas of Iranian-American video artist Shirin Neshat. Neshat's work, which made abundant use of Persian calligraphy projected onto bodies, had been shown in the Netherlands in 1997 and 2000.

Murder of Theo van Gogh

On 2 November 2004, Van Gogh was assassinated in public by Mohammed Bouyeri, a Dutch-Moroccan Muslim with a Dutch passport. A letter, stabbed through and affixed to the body by a dagger, linked the murder to Van Gogh's film and his views regarding Islam. It was addressed to Ayaan Hirsi Ali and called for a jihad against kafir (unbelievers or infidels), against America, Europe, the Netherlands, and Hirsi Ali herself. Following the murder of Van Gogh, tens of thousands gathered in the center of Amsterdam to mourn Van Gogh's death. Besides Bouyeri, eleven other Muslim men were arrested and charged with conspiracy to assassinate Hirsi Ali. Bouyeri was jailed for life, for which in the Netherlands there is no possibility of parole, and pardons are rarely granted. Some of the others were convicted of other offences in relation to their involvement in the so-called Hofstad Network, but not for a direct connection with the Van Gogh murder.

See also
 Apostasy in Islam
 Criticism of Islam
 Criticism of the Quran

Women in Muslim societies
 Islam and domestic violence
 Namus
 Women in Islam

Other controversies
 Jyllands-Posten Muhammad cartoons controversy – following publication of cartoons in a Danish newspaper in 2005
 Lars Vilks Muhammad drawings controversy – beginning in 2007
 Fitna – 2008 Dutch short film critical of Islam
 Charlie Hebdo shooting – 2015 murders in Paris following publication of cartoons

References

External links
 Submission on YouTube
 
 Hirsi Ali on Film over Position of Women in Koran

2004 films
2004 drama films
2004 short films
Dutch drama films
Dutch short films
2000s English-language films
Films directed by Theo van Gogh
Islam-related controversies in Europe
2004 in Islam
Anti-Islam works
Obscenity controversies in film
Religious controversies in film
Religious controversies in the Netherlands